The Noel Redding Band (also known as The Clonakilty Cowboys after the title of its first album, Clonakilty Cowboys) was an English-Irish folk rock supergroup that was formed in Clonakilty, County Cork, in 1974. Comprising the bass guitarist, rhythm guitarist and vocalist Noel Redding (formerly of The Jimi Hendrix Experience, Fat Mattress and Road), the vocalist and keyboard player Dave Clarke, the lead guitarist Eric Bell (formerly of Thin Lizzy and Them) and the drummer Les Sampson (formerly of Road), the band released two albums – Clonakilty Cowboys (1975) and Blowin' (1976) – before disbanding in 1978.

History
After Fat Mattress split up in 1970, Redding joined the Los Angeles-based group Road, which released an album, Road,  before disbanding in 1972. Following this, Redding decided to form an eponymous band, again working with Road's drummer Sampson. Redding also hired Clarke and, later, Bell, who at first expressed doubts about the quality of Redding's written material.

During a break following the release of a second album in 1976, Sampson left and was replaced by Dave Donovan (ex-Roy Wood). This incarnation of the band toured Holland and disbanded in late 1978.

Like other bands formed by Redding, it was relatively short-lived, releasing two albums in 1975 and 1976 before splitting up in 1978. Tracks recorded for a third, unreleased album were later released as The Missing Album on Mouse Records.

Redding once suggested in an interview that The Clonakilty Cowboys was the band which gave him "the most pleasure".

Band members
Noel Redding – bass guitar, rhythm guitar, lead vocals
Dave Clarke – lead vocals, keyboards, piano, organ, clavinet
Eric Bell – lead guitar, backing vocals
Les Sampson – drums, percussion
Dave Donovan – drums, percussion

Discography
Clonakilty Cowboys (1975)
Blowin' (1976)
The Missing Album (1995)

References
General

Specific

English rock music groups
Irish rock music groups
Folk music supergroups
British supergroups
Musical groups from County Cork
Musical groups established in 1972
Musical groups disestablished in 1976